The QF 4-inch Mk XIX gun was a British low-velocity 4-inch 40-calibre naval gun used to arm small warships such as  and  and some   in World War II, mainly against submarines.

Description
It succeeded the higher-velocity World War I-era BL 4-inch Mk IX (typically deployed on s in the escort role). The high-angle mounting used for the XIX added some anti-aircraft capability and allowed it to fire starshells to illuminate the battle area at night.

Ammunition

Surviving examples
 On  at Williamstown, Victoria, Australia.
 On the parade ground at the Irish Naval Service Base, Haulbowline, Co. Cork, Ireland

Notes

References

Bibliography
 John Campbell, "Naval Weapons Of World War Two", Annapolis : Naval Institute Press, 1985,

External links

 Tony DiGiulian, Britain 4"/40 (10.2 cm) QF Mark XIX

Naval guns of the United Kingdom
World War II naval weapons of the United Kingdom
100 mm artillery
Military equipment introduced in the 1930s